Surrey Memorial Hospital (SMH) is a publicly funded hospital owned and operated by Fraser Health in the city of Surrey, British Columbia, Canada adjacent to King George Boulevard.

Overview
Surrey Memorial Hospital began operations in early 1959, with its official opening being on 31 January. It is one of twelve hospitals under the jurisdiction of the Fraser Health Authority, which provides health services to more than 1.8 million people.

Surrey Memorial is the second largest hospital in British Columbia and has the busiest emergency department. As of 2019, SMH provides service to over 158,558 emergency department patients per year, making it the second busiest in Canada.

The hospital offers general medical services, as well as a dedicated pediatrics emergency area, a regional referral centre for specialized pediatrics and maternity care, hospice, and two extended care units. SMH specializes in cancer and renal care, kidney dialysis, and sleep disorders. In addition, there are Adolescent and Adult Psychiatry Inpatient Units. Surrey Memorial Hospital along with the nearby Jim Pattison Outpatient Care and Surgery Centre perform more immediate breast reconstruction surgeries per year than any other centre in Canada for women with breast cancer.

Expansion 

On March 21, 2011, construction broke ground on a new eight-storey Critical Care Tower to expand Surrey Memorial Hospital. The expansion, on completion, increased the number of acute care beds by 30% to 650 and included a new emergency department almost five times the size of the previous ER. The project provides 48 private neonatal rooms, 25 Intensive Care beds, 25 High Acuity Unit beds, two dedicated medical floors, an expanded laboratory, rooftop helipad, and additional space for SMH's clinical academic campus.

Construction of the new Emergency Department was completed by winter 2013, with the Critical Care Tower being opened in June 2014.

History 
After World War II, the population of suburban communities like Surrey were growing. The nearest hospital, Royal Columbian Hospital in New Westminster, began limiting access to residents from the growing suburban communities.

In 1948, the White Rock Hospital Society formed to fundraise and advocate for government support for creation of a hospital (Peace Arch Hospital) for White Rock and South Surrey, while residents of North Surrey and Cloverdale advocated for a hospital in the northern part of the district, which ended up being Surrey Memorial Hospital.

Premier W. A. C. Bennett of the British Columbia Social Credit Party required the community to contribute at least one-third of costs for construction. For Surrey Memorial, that equalled $100,000. The women who formed Surrey's first "Ladies Auxiliary" not only rose to the challenge, but personally delivered the funds to the premier in his Victoria office.

Ultimately, the efforts of the community succeeded in the creation of the hospital. The hospital opened on 31 January 1959 in a ceremony officiated by then B.C. health minister Eric Martin. A few thousand people were in attendance, with tours of the new hospital also being given.

In 1992, the Surrey Hospital & Outpatient Centre Foundation was established which has since raised more than $60 million to purchase medical equipment, fund innovative programs, and support training and research.

SMH was eventually merged into the South Fraser Health Region (SFHR) which also administered health care in Delta, Surrey and Langley. In 2001, SMH came under management of Fraser Health when SFHR was merged with its neighbouring health regions to create a new regional health authority.

Under the guidance of Dr. Peter Doris and Dr. Adrian Lee, the breast reconstruction program was launched in 2003. This quickly expanded with the addition of trained breast and reconstructive surgeons Dr. Rhonda Janzen, Dr. Paul Oxley and Dr. Rizwan Mian. In 2011 the Breast Health Clinic was launched at the Jim Pattison Out Patient and Surgery Centre. Now with three general surgeons and five plastic surgeons, this clinic has become one of the leaders of breast cancer care in Canada.

References

External links
 Location site on fraserhealth.ca
 Map of hospital buildings and grounds

Hospital buildings completed in 1959
Hospitals in British Columbia
Hospitals established in 1959
Buildings and structures in Surrey, British Columbia
1959 establishments in British Columbia
Certified airports in British Columbia
Heliports in Canada